Mafia Connection (also known as Black Lemons) is a 1970 Italian crime film written and directed  by Camillo Bazzoni and starring Antonio Sabàto, Peter Carsten  and Florinda Bolkan.

Plot

Cast

Antonio Sabàto as  Rosario Inzulia
 Peter Carsten as Orlando Lo Presti
 Silvano Tranquilli as Commissioner Modica
 Pier Paolo Capponi as  Francesco Macaluso
 Don Backy as  Carmelo Rizzo 
 Florinda Bolkan as  Rossana
 Didi Perego as  Concettina
 Lee Burton as  Michele  
 Raf Sparanero as  Antonio 
  Maria Luisa Sala as  Assunta
 Frank Latimore as The American 
 Stefano Satta Flores as Hitman
 Massimo Farinelli as Giancarlo Lo Presti
  Loris Bazzocchi as  Pasquale Sciortino

Reception
Film critic Roberto Curti referred to the film as "more the work of an accomplished cinematographer than that of a director, lacking inner thematic coherence but showing a stylistic flair which puts it above other genre efforts of the period".

References

External links

Italian crime films
1970 crime films
1970 films
Films about the Sicilian Mafia
Films directed by Camillo Bazzoni
Films scored by Carlo Rustichelli
1970s Italian films